Milisavljević is a Serbian surname, a patronymic derived from the Slavic masculine given name Milisav. It may refer to:

Nemanja Milisavljević. (born 1984) Serbian footballer
Branko Milisavljević (born 1976) Serbian basketball player

Serbian surnames